Utetheisa ypsilon is a moth in the family Erebidae. It was described by Rob de Vos in 2007. It is found on Sulawesi in Indonesia.

References

Moths described in 2007
ypsilon